Kurnool Airport, officially known as Uyyalawada Narasimha Reddy Airport,  is a greenfield airport at Orvakal, Kurnool district in the Indian state of Andhra Pradesh. The airport has begun commercial operations in March 2021.

History

Planning 
In 2008, the government of Andhra Pradesh invited for expressions of interest to develop eight minor airports in the state, including an airport at Kurnool. Each airport was expected to cost . The construction of this airport was chosen because Kurnool had a large paper mill producing 300 tonnes of paper every day.

In July 2009, the government has scrapped the plans as no companies posted bids for the construction of the airport. The companies sought the construction to be infeasible due to low expectation of revenues. The government has offered additional incentives including exemption from value added taxes and waiver of lease rentals for the first seven years once the airport is operational. 

Later in 2013, the central government has identified Kurnool as one of the 50 locations for the development of low-cost airports in order to improve connectivity to remote areas.

Construction 
The Indian Ministry of Civil Aviation had given the site clearance in February 2016. The state government approved the allocation of land in February 2017.

The foundation stone was laid in June 2017 by the then Chief Minister of Andhra Pradesh, N. Chandrababu Naidu. After trial runs were successfully conducted at the end of 2018, he has later inaugurated the airport on 8 January 2019. At this time, the runway and terminal buildings were constructed, however, works related to air traffic control were not completed. Two years later, on 15 January 2021, the civil aviation authority DGCA has granted the aerodrome license to the airport for public use. Later on 27 January, the Bureau of Civil Aviation Security (BCAS) has granted security clearance.

On 25 March 2021, the airport is re-inaugurated by the current Chief Minister, Y. S. Jagan Mohan Reddy. He has also named the airport as Uyyalawada Narasimha Reddy Airport, commemorating the freedom fighter Uyyalawada Narasimha Reddy who originated from Kurnool district. The government has also started discussion for a pilot training institute and an aircraft repair centre. On 28 March 2021, commercial operations has begun with a ceremonial IndiGo flight from Bangalore.

The airport has a  runway with four aprons for parking of aircraft. It has been categorized as '3C' and is capable of handling turboprop aircraft like ATR-72 and Bombardier Q-400.

Airlines and destinations

Access 
The airport is located directly on National Highway 40 connecting Kurnool and Nandyal. There are no railway lines connecting the airport.

See also 

 Aviation in India
 List of Airports in India

References

Airports in Andhra Pradesh
Transport in Kurnool district
2019 establishments in Andhra Pradesh
Airports established in 2019